Kristen Aston Arrington is an American politician and businesswoman serving as a member of the Florida House of Representatives from the 43rd district. She assumed office on November 3, 2020.

Early life and education 
Arrington was born in Holiday, Florida and graduated from Osceola High School. She has an Associate of Arts degree in political science and government from Valencia College.

Career 
From 2006 to 2012, Arrington worked as a property manager. From 2012 to 2015, she was a consultant for the Transportation and Expressway Authority Membership of Florida. In 2015, she founded Pitbull Strategies, a social media marketing company. Arrington was elected to the Florida House of Representatives in November 2020. She is a member of the House Education & Employment Committee.

References 

Living people
Year of birth missing (living people)
People from Holiday, Florida
People from Osceola County, Florida
Valencia College alumni
Democratic Party members of the Florida House of Representatives
Women state legislators in Florida
21st-century American women